Sir Patrick Agnew, 1st Baronet (c. 1578–1661) was the son of Sir Andrew Agnew of Lochnaw and Agnes Stewart.

Succession
He was created 1st Baronet Agnew, of Lochnaw on 28 July 1629. On his death in 1661 he was succeeded in the baronetcy by his eldest son. He was buried at Leswalt.

Career
He was Member of the Parliament of Scotland for Wigtownshire, 1628–1633 and 1643–1647.

Family
He married Margaret Kennedy, daughter of Sir Thomas Kennedy, Master of Cassillis and Elizabeth McGill, (c1598), and had issue:
Sir Andrew Agnew, 2nd Baronet (d.1671)
Lt.-Col. James Agnew (d. c1661)
Patrick Agnew, 1st of Sheuchan
Lt.-Col. Alexander Agnew, 1st of Whitehills
Jane Agnew, married Alexander MacDowall (1621)
Agnes Agnew, married Uchtred MacDowall (1622)
Marie Agnew, married Hew MacDowall
Rosina Agnew, married John Cathcart (1632)
Elizabeth Agnew, married John Baillie

References
thePeerage.com

1570s births
1661 deaths
Baronets in the Baronetage of Nova Scotia
Shire Commissioners to the Parliament of Scotland
Members of the Parliament of Scotland 1628–1633
Members of the Convention of the Estates of Scotland 1643–44
Members of the Parliament of Scotland 1644–1647